Melor is a Breton saint.

Melor may also refer to:
 Melor Sturua, Russian journalist
 Melor (state constituency), Kelantan, Malaysia
 Typhoon Melor (disambiguation)

See also
 Mellor